The 2017–18 SSV Jahn Regensburg season is the 111th season in the club's football history. In 2017–18, the club plays in the 2. Bundesliga, the second tier of German football. It was the club's first season back in this league, having won promotion from the 3. Liga in 2016–17 after a play-off victory over TSV 1860 Munich.

The club also took part in the 2017–18 edition of the DFB-Pokal, the German Cup, but was eliminated in the second round.

Events
SSV Jahn Regensburg won promotion after beating TSV 1860 Munich in the 2016–17 2. Bundesliga relegation play-offs. The contract of the manager Heiko Herrlich was only valid for the 3. Liga and despite a verbal agreement to continue as manager, Herrlich decided to join Bundesliga club Bayer 04 Leverkusen instead. On 26 June 2017, Achim Beierlorzer took over as new manager.

In June 2017, the Global Sports Invest AG with CEO Philipp Schober bought 90% of the shares of the SSV Jahn Regensburg GmbH & Co KGaA (the owner of the professional football team) from Bauteam Tretzel, a construction company which is involved in the corruption affair in Regensburg. The management of the club claimed not to be involved in the corruption affair concerning campaign donations for mayor Joachim Wolbergs.

Regensburg did not start well in the season. They lost the first league match to a player's blunder in injury time and also lost the second match. In the first round of the DFB-Pokal, they reached the next round with a victory over fellow league side SV Darmstadt 98. The week after, Regensburg won the first three points in the league in an away match against FC Ingolstadt 04. With only six points from the next eight league matches, Regensburg dropped to the 15th place, the lowest place in the table without relegation. They ware also eliminated in the second round of the DFB-Pokal by fellow league side 1. FC Heidenheim. But the next league matches against the lower placed teams 1. FC Kaiserslautern and SpVgg Greuther Fürth could be won and the Jahn collected ten points until the winter break which earned them a secured spot in the middle of the table.

In September 2017, Bauteam Tretzel withdrew from their contract with the Global Sports Invest and transferred 62% of the shares of the SSV Jahn Regensburg GmbH & Co KGaA to SSV Jahn Regensburg (the club). Finally, the club could acquire all the shares in October 2017.

After the winter break, Regensburg was in a good form and could eventually climb to the fourth place in the table, only two points behind the third place which would qualify them to the promotion play-offs. Nevertheless, they were only nine points ahead of the 16th place which would send them to the relegation play-offs, so they could still not be sure that they avoided relegation. With the 3–1 victory over FC St. Pauli on the 31st matchday, they finally managed to avoid relegation and still had a chance at the promotion play-offs. But they only won one point from the last three matches and finished the league in fifth place. This was the first time that Jahn Regensburg could avoid relegation from the 2. Bundesliga and a great success for the team.

Transfers

In

Out

Preseason and friendlies

2. Bundesliga

2. Bundesliga fixtures & results

League table

DFB-Pokal

Player information
.

|}

Notes
A.   Kickoff time in Central European Time/Central European Summer Time.
B.   SSV Jahn Regensburg goals first.

References

SSV Jahn Regensburg seasons
Regensburg